Matthew "Matt" Sates (born 28 July 2003) is a South African swimmer. He is the African record holder in the short course 200 metre freestyle, 400 metre freestyle, and 200 metre individual medley as well as the South African record holder in the 400 metre individual medley. He is the 2022 World Short Course champion in the 200 metre individual medley and bronze medalist in the 400 metre individual medley. At the 2022 NCAA Division I Championships, he won the NCAA title in the 500 yard freestyle. For the 2021 FINA Swimming World Cup, he was the overall male winner, earning a total of 18 medals, including 13 gold medals.

Background and details 
Sates was born on 28 July 2003 and lives in Pietermaritzburg in South Africa with his mother and sister. He reportedly became a swimmer at a young age when he followed his older brother Tim into swimming. He has said of the sport, "Swimming has just always been a part of me." He attended St. Charles College in Pietermaritzburg.

He trains by Wayne Riddin at Seals Swimming Club in Pietermaritzburg and verbally committed to entering the University of Georgia in 2022 to train under Neil Versfeld, a renowned South African Olympic swimmer and coach. Competing for the Georgia Bulldogs during the 2021–2022 collegiate season, he won the NCAA title in the 500 yard freestyle in March 2022 before permanently relocating back to South Africa in April 2022 and becoming a professional swimmer.

Career

2019 World Junior Championships
At the 2019 FINA World Junior Swimming Championships, held at Danube Arena in Budapest, Hungary, Sates placed tenth in the 4×100 metre medley relay, 20th in the 200 metre individual medley with a 2:05.01, 29th in the 100 metre butterfly in 55.23 seconds, 37th in the 200 metre breaststroke with a time of 2:21.55, 40th in the 100 metre breaststroke with a 1:04.42, and 46th in the 50 metre breaststroke with a time of 30.43 seconds.

2021
At the 2021 South African Grand Prix in Durban in May 2021, Sates achieved Olympic Games cuts for the 200 metre individual medley, 1:57.60 in the prelims heats, and 100 metre butterfly, 51.83 seconds in a time trial.

2020 Summer Olympics

Sates competed in two events at the 2020 Summer Olympics in Tokyo, Japan. He qualified to compete in the Olympics (delayed until July 2021 due to the COVID-19 pandemic) in May 2021 and was called "the next Michael Phelps" in the media leading up to the start of competition. At the 2020 Olympic Games, Sates finished 14th in the 200 metre individual medley, just two places behind Chase Kalisz of the United States, and 32nd in the 100 metre butterfly.

2021 Swimming World Cup
In the 2021 FINA Swimming World Cup, which consisted of four competitions across two continents in October 2021 and was conducted in short course metres, Sates was the overall highest-scoring male competitor with a total of 227 points across all four stops that earned him $140,000 of prize money. He also earned the most medals amongst all competitors, male or female, with a total of eighteen medals, which included thirteen gold medals, four silver medals, and one bronze medal.

Sates set his first world junior record of the World Cup circuit at the first stop, in Berlin, Germany, with a time of 1:51.45 in the 200 metre individual medley on 2 October. His swim also moved him to the eighth fastest swimmer in the event in history, just two spots and 31-hundredths of a second behind Caeleb Dressel of the United States. The next day, Sates set his second world junior record of the World Cup circuit with a time of 1:40.65 in the 200 metre freestyle, where he won the gold medal and finished less than two-tenths of a second ahead of the silver medalist in the event Kyle Chalmers of Australia. These first two world junior records earned Sates the number two spot on Swimming World'''s "The Week That Was" honour for the week of 4 October 2021. Four days later, on 7 October, at the second stop of the World Cup, held in Budapest, Hungary, Sates set his third world junior record, this time in the 400 metre freestyle with a time of 3:37.92.Sutherland, James (7 October 2021). "Matt Sates Scorches 3:37.92 For New World Junior Record In 400 Free (SCM)". SwimSwam. Retrieved 1 November 2021. Sates winning multiple medals, setting multiple world junior records, and winning the overall male title was ranked as the number one moment from the 2021 Swimming World Cup by FINA.

2021 World Short Course Championships
Sates entered to compete in five individual events, the 200 metre freestyle, 400 metre freestyle, 100 metre individual medley, 200 metre individual medley, and 400 metre individual medley, for the 2021 World Short Course Championships at Etihad Arena in Abu Dhabi, United Arab Emirates.Race, Retta (10 December 2021). "Entry Lists Published For 2021 FINA Short Course World Championships". SwimSwam. Retrieved 10 December 2021. Two days before the start of the competition, Sates was announced as withdrawing from the championships due to travel restrictions making it hard for him to leave the country of South Africa due to a surge in a new variant of COVID-19.

2022
On 21 January 2022, Sates arrived in Athens, Georgia in the United States to start competing collegiately as part of the Georgia Bulldogs at the University of Georgia with his first competition appearance scheduled for 29 January 2022. In his first collegiate competition, a dual meet against Emory University on 29 January, Sates won the 200 yard freestyle with a time of 1:33.89. He also swam a 4:31.29 in the 500 yard freestyle and a 1:49.23 in the 200 yard individual medley swimming exhibition.

2022 Southeastern Conference Championships
In his first collegiate conference championships, the 2022 Southeastern Conference, SEC, Championships in February 2022, Sates swam a 1:31.82 for the lead-off leg of the 4×200 yard freestyle relay to help take second-place in 6:09.32 on day one.Dornan, Ben (15 February 2022). "2022 SEC Championships: Day 1 Finals Live Recap". SwimSwam. Retrieved 15 February 2022. His time of 1:31.82 ranked Sates as the fifth-fastest male freshman in the 200 yard freestyle in the history of the NCAA, behind Townley Haas, Dean Farris, Cameron Craig, and Drew Kibler. In the prelims heats of the 500 yard freestyle on day two, Sates lowered his personal best time in the event by approximately 17 seconds to a 4:13.65 to rank third overall heading into the final. For the final of the 500 yard freestyle, Sates set a new pool record in a time of 4:09.06 and placed first, finishing over one second ahead of second-place finisher Kieran Smith. He qualified ranking first for the final of the 200 yard freestyle with a time of 1:32.59 in the prelims heats on day three. In the final, he won with a time of 1:31.16, breaking the pool record of 1:31.65 set in 2013 and finishing 0.23 seconds ahead of second-place finisher Brooks Curry. On Day four of competition, Sates ranked third in the prelims heat of the 200 yard butterfly, qualifying for the final with a time of 1:41.91, which was 1.83 seconds behind first-ranked Luca Urlando. In the final, he placed second with a 1:39.88, this time finishing 0.88 seconds behind Luca Urlando.De George, Matthew (18 February 2022). "2022 SEC Championships, Day 4 Finals: Luca Urlando Throws Down 1:39 200 Fly". Swimming World. Retrieved 18 February 2022. For the 4×100 yard medley relay later in the session, Sates and Luca Urlando were part of the same relay team, with Sates splitting a 46.03 for the butterfly leg of the relay to help finish fourth in 3:04.76. On the fifth and final day, he led off the 4×100 yard freestyle relay in 42.71 to help achieve a time of 2:50.65 and a fourth-place finish.

Following his performances at the SEC Championships, Sates swam the 400 yard individual medley in 3:41.85 and the 200 yard individual medley in 1:44.83 at the 2022 Bulldog Last Chance Meet in an attempt to see if he could qualify for the 2022 NCAA Championships in the events.

2022 NCAA Championships

On day one of the 2022 NCAA Championships in March, Sates opened the 4×200 yard freestyle with a 1:30.78 for the lead-off leg, helping achieve a final mark of 6:05.59 and a second-place finish. The morning of day two, he ranked first in the prelims heats of the 500 yard freestyle with a time of 4:08.73, qualifying for the evening final. He swam a 4:06.61 in the final, winning the event and setting new NCAA Championships and pool records.Lepesant, Anne (24 March 2022). "Georgia Freshman Matthew Sates Downs NCAA Meet Record In 500 Free With 4:06.61". SwimSwam. Retrieved 24 March 2022."Georgia's Matthew Sates, Arizona State's Leon Marchand win swimming events at NCAAs". ESPN. 24 March 2022. Retrieved 8 April 2022. On the third day, he advanced to the final of the 200 yard freestyle, ranking second behind Drew Kibler with a time of 1:31.11 from the prelims heats.Rieder, David (25 March 2022). "NCAA Men's Championships: Drew Kibler Edges Matt Sates in 200 Free Prelims; 1:32.00 for Eighth". Swimming World. Retrieved 25 March 2022. In the final, he won his second individual medal of the Championships, finishing third with a personal best time of 1:30.72. For his second final of the session, he swam the 100 yard butterfly portion of the 4×100 yard medley relay in 46.39 seconds, contributing to a final time of 3:03.92 and a twelfth-place finish. On the fourth and final day, he swam a 1:43.34 and placed 29th in the 200 yard butterfly. Concluding his first NCAA Championships, Sates swam a 42.90 for the third leg of the 4×100 yard freestyle relay to help place eleventh in a combined time of 2:48.81.

2022 South Africa Championships
At the 2022 South Africa National Swimming Championships in Gqeberha in April, Sates qualified for the final of the 400 metre freestyle on day one with a time of 3:54.94 in the prelims heats. In the evening finals session, he won the gold medal in the 400 metre freestyle with a 3:49.37 and the bronze medal in the 50 metre butterfly with a time of 24.28 seconds.Race, Retta (6 April 2022). "Van Niekerk, Canny, Coetze Qualify For Budapest World Championships". SwimSwam. Retrieved 6 April 2022. On day two, he swam a 1:47.09 in the prelims heats of the 200 metre freestyle to qualify for the evening final ranking first. In the final, he won the gold medal with a time of 1:46.15, which achieved him a qualifying time in the 200 metre freestyle for the 2022 World Aquatics Championships and 2022 Commonwealth Games, and won a gold medal in the 4×100 metre freestyle relay, swimming the lead-off leg for the relay team from KwaZulu-Natal.Isaacson, David (7 April 2022). "'Rebel' Matthew Sates qualifies for world champs in 200m freestyle". TimesLIVE. Retrieved 8 April 2022.Butler, Lynn (8 April 2022). "Matthew Sates earns Commonwealth Games spot at SA Swimming Championships". News24. Retrieved 8 April 2022. It was his first time qualifying for a World Aquatics Championships and a Commonwealth Games. On the third day, he won the gold medal in the 100 metre freestyle with a personal best time of 48.97 seconds.Lambley, Garrin (8 April 2022). "Chad le Clos shakes off butterflies to secure Commonwealth Games qualifying time". The South African. Retrieved 8 April 2022. For the 100 metre butterfly on day four, he won the silver medal with a time of 52.06 seconds, finishing only behind Chad le Clos.Jonckheere, Karien (9 April 2022). "18-year-old matric pupil stuns Olympic superstar Tatjana Schoenmaker at SA swim champs". News24. Retrieved 9 April 2022. In the first prelims heat of the 200 metre individual medley on the sixth and final day, he swam a World Championships and Commonwealth Games qualifying time of 1:59.13 and qualified for the evening final, where he went on to lower his time to a 1:58.37 and win the gold medal.Isaacson, David (11 April 2022). "King Matt gathers the crowns, speedy Pieter the qualifying times". TimesLIVE. Retrieved 11 April 2022."Sates wraps up SA Championships with fourth national title". Swimming South Africa. 12 April 2022. Retrieved 12 April 2022. He had also entered to swim the 400 metre individual medley and 200 metre butterfly; however, due to wear on his shoulders from swimming butterfly, he chose to withdraw and not compete in those events. In May, Swimming South Africa also named Sates to the World Championships team in the 100 metre freestyle and 400 metre freestyle. In June, he was named to the 2022 Commonwealth Games swim team representing South Africa.

2022 Mare Nostrum
At the 2022 Mare Nostrum stop in Monaco, Sates swam a personal best time of 1:57.43 in the 200 metre individual medley, winning the event. A few days later, at the stop in Barcelona, Spain, he won the 200 metre freestyle with another personal best time, finishing in 1:45.91 and setting a new meet record in the event.Isaacson, David (25 May 2022). "Matthew Sates outguns Olympic champion in Barcelona". TimesLIVE. Retrieved 26 May 2022.

2022 World Aquatics Championships
In the preliminaries of the 200 metre freestyle at the 2022 World Aquatics Championships on 19 June, Sates qualified for the semifinals ranking fourteenth with a 1:47.28. He tied Katsuhiro Matsumoto of Japan for twelfth-place in the semifinals with a time of 1:46.63."Semifinal performances from Van Niekerk and Sates". SuperSport. 19 June 2022. Retrieved 19 June 2022. The day before, he placed eleventh in the preliminaries of the 400 metre individual medley with a time of 4:14.81. For the prelims of the 200 metre individual medley two days later, he swam a 1:58.61 and qualified for the semifinals ranking seventh. Finishing with a time of 1:57.74 in semifinal heat number two, he qualified for the final ranking eighth. In the final, he swam a 1:58.27 and placed eighth. The final of the 200 metre individual medley was both his first final at a long course metres World Championships as well as the first final at the 2022 World Aquatics Championships in which South Africa had a swimmer compete.Botton, Wesley (22 June 2022). "Matt Sates settles for eighth place in World Champs final". The Citizen. Retrieved 22 June 2022. One day later, he placed 41st in the 100 metre butterfly with a time of 54.17 seconds.

2022 Commonwealth Games
Day one of swimming at the 2022 Commonwealth Games, held in Birmingham, England, Sates advanced to the final in the 400 metre freestyle ranking sixth in the preliminaries with a time of 3:49.69."Commonwealth Games results - Day 1". New Straits Times. 29 July 2022. Retrieved 29 July 2022. He placed seventh in the final with a time of 3:50.07."Commonwealth Games Day 1: Van Niekerk powers again to Games record to advance to 50m final, Le Clos fails to defend 50m fly". News24. 29 July 2022. Retrieved 29 July 2022. On day two, he ranked seventh in the preliminaries of the 200 metre freestyle with a 1:48.25 and qualified for the event final. Later, in the same preliminaries session, he achieved a qualification for the final in the 400 metre individual medley, ranking third overall with a time of 4:19.04. He lowered his time to 1:47.75 in the evening final of the 200 metre freestyle, placing sixth. For the final of the 400 metre individual medley, he placed fourth with a time of 4:16.61. Three days later, he ranked fourteenth in the preliminaries of the 100 metre butterfly with a time of 54.02 seconds and qualified for the semifinals.

Sates withdrew from the semifinals of the 100 metre butterfly, instead focusing on the 4×200 metre freestyle relay final, where he split a 1:47.07 for the lead-off leg of the relay to help achieve a final mark of 7:13.76 and place sixth. The next morning, he swam the butterfly leg of the 4×100 metre mixed medley relay in a time of 53.57 seconds in the preliminaries to help qualify the relay for the final ranking fourth. Chad le Clos substituted in for Sates on the finals relay, lowered the butterfly time by over two full seconds and helped achieve a fourth-place finish in the event. On the sixth and final day, he placed twelfth in the 200 metre individual medley with a time of 2:01.99.

2022 Swimming World Cup
Sates won his first gold medal of the 2022 FINA Swimming World Cup circuit at the first stop, in Berlin, Germany, in the 400 metre freestyle with an African record, South African record, and personal best time of 3:36.30, finishing 0.97 seconds ahead of Kieran Smith of the United States.Isaacson, David (21 October 2022). "Matthew Sates torpedoes old African record as he starts World Cup in style". TimesLIVE. Retrieved 21 October 2022. He followed his gold medal up with a silver medal in the 100 metre individual medley, finishing one-tenth of a second behind gold medalist Thomas Ceccon with a personal best time of 51.62 seconds.FINA (21 October 2022). "FINA Swimming World Cup 2022 Berlin (GER): Men's 100m Individual Medley Final Results". Omega Timing. Retrieved 21 October 2022. On the second day, he won the gold medal in the 200 metre individual medley with a time of 1:51.64. On the third day, he won the 400 metre individual medley ahead of Alberto Razzetti of Italy, with a time of 4:02.95, and the 200 metre freestyle, where he finished 0.21 seconds ahead of Kyle Chalmers in 1:40.88.Jonckheere, Karien (23 October 2022). "Sates completes tough golden double on the final day in Berlin". SuperSport. Retrieved 23 October 2022. He ranked as the highest-scoring male competitor across all of his events in Berlin.

On day one at the next stop, in Toronto, Canada, Sates collected an additional two medals, the first in the 400 metre freestyle with a 3:37.52 and the second in the 100 metre individual medley with a 51.87.FINA (28 October 2022). "FINA Swimming World Cup 2022 Toronto (CAN): Men's 100m Individual Medley Final Results". Omega Timing. Retrieved 28 October 2022. The next day, he placed fourth in the 200 metre individual medley in a time of 1:52.89, which was 2.52 seconds behind gold medalist Shaine Casas of the United States who, with his win, also moved ahead of Sates into the overall number one rank for the World Cup by a margin of 0.7 points. He finished up on day three with a gold medal in the 400 metre individual medley with a time of 4:02.65 and a tie for fourth place in the 200 metre freestyle with a 1:42.46.FINA (30 October 2022). "FINA Swimming World Cup 2022 Toronto (CAN): Men's 200m Freestyle Final Results". Omega Timing. Retrieved 31 October 2022.

For the third and final stop of the circuit, held in November in Indianapolis, United States, Sates won one medal, a gold medal in the 400 metre individual medley on day three with a time of 4:04.12.Jonckheere, Karien (6 November 2022). "SA's Sates wraps up World Cup series triple crown". SuperSport. Retrieved 7 November 2022. Summing the points he earned for each of his performances across all three stops of the 2022 circuit, he ranked as the fifth overall highest-scoring male competitor with 154.1 points.Butler, Lynn (7 November 2022). "Le Clos stars to claim 3rd spot in Swimming World Cup series, Sates ends 5th". News24. Retrieved 7 November 2022.

2022 World Short Course Championships

Day one at the 2022 World Short Course Championships in Melbourne, Australia, Sates split a 57.31 for the anchor leg of the 4×100 metre freestyle relay to help place thirteenth overall. In the evening, he won the world title and gold medal in the 200 metre individual medley with an African record, Commonwealth record, and South African record time of 1:50.15, which was a 1.30 second drop from his previous best time and record marks in the event.Botton, Wesley (13 December 2022). "Matt Sates storms to gold for SA at World Short-Course Champs". The Citizen. Retrieved 14 December 2022."Golden start for Sates at World Short Course Championships in Melbourne". Swimming South Africa. 13 December 2022. Retrieved 14 December 2022. Two days later, he placed twelfth in the 400 metre freestyle with a time of 3:41.05. On day five of six, he finished in a South African record time of 3:59.21 in the final of the 400 metre individual medley to win the bronze medal.Butler, Lynn (17 December 2022). "Sates clinches bronze with SA record in Melbourne: 'It was pretty cool'". News24. Retrieved 19 December 2022. In his final event, the 200 metre freestyle on the sixth and final day, he placed thirteenth overall with a time of 1:43.22.

International championships (50 m)

 Sates swam only in the prelims heats.

International championships (25 m)

Collegiate championships (25 yd)

Personal best times

Long course metres (50 m pool)

Legend: tt – time trial

Short course metres (25 m pool)

Short course yards (25 yd pool)

Legend: r – relay 1st leg; tt – time trial

Swimming World Cup circuits
The following medals Sates has won at Swimming World Cup circuits.

Records
World junior records
Short course metres (25 m pool)

Continental and national records
Short course metres (25 m pool)

Awards and honours
 FINA, Top 10 Moments: 2021 Swimming World Cup (#1)
 Southeastern Conference (SEC), Freshman Swimmer of the Year (male): 2021–2022
 Swimming World, The Week That Was: 4 October 2021 (#2)
 SwimSwam, Top 100 (Men's): 2022 (#44)
 SwimSwam'', Swammy Award honorable mention, NCAA Freshman of the Year (Men's): 2022

References

External links

2003 births
Living people
South African male swimmers
Male medley swimmers
Male butterfly swimmers
Olympic swimmers of South Africa
Swimmers at the 2020 Summer Olympics
21st-century South African people
Swimmers at the 2022 Commonwealth Games
Commonwealth Games competitors for South Africa
Georgia Bulldogs men's swimmers
Medalists at the FINA World Swimming Championships (25 m)